Oxymerus vianai is a species of beetle in the family Cerambycidae. It was described by Huedepohl in 1979.

References

Trachyderini
Beetles described in 1979